Flamborough railway station was located in the village of Marton, and was originally named after that location. However, there were several other railway stations also called Marton, so on 1 July 1884 the North Eastern Railway renamed it after the village of Flamborough several miles away. It was situated on the Yorkshire Coast Line from Scarborough to Hull and was opened on 20 October 1847 by the York and North Midland Railway.

History
The station was opened by the York and North Midland Railway in October 1847. The station was located immediately north of the gated level crossing that spanned the road from Marton, and had a G. T. Andrews designed building. The extra effort put into Flamborough station was due to the influence of the Yarburgh family of nearby Sewerby Hall, who used the station.

The station had a small goods yard which was the nearest loading point for fish landed at Flamborough. The distance between the station and coast was also seen as detrimental to the burgeoning tourist trade and in the 1890s, a branch was proposed by the residents, something which the North Eastern Railway considered, but refused to undertake.

The goods yard handled mostly fish (notably  of herring in August 1889), corn and coal. The NER had a policy of making their stationmasters the agent for the handling of coal, which guaranteed traffic for the railway company. The station master at Flamborough in 1920 had an annual wage of £230, but the profit on the coal handled at the station was £95. Wagons loaded with fish were allowed to be attached to Hull-bound trains via gravity whilst the Hull service was waiting in the southbound platform.

Cattle and stone were also handled at the station; the chalk cutting just to the north of the station was opened out into a quarry in 1876. During the First World War, the line was singled as an economy measure. The station was host to a LNER camping coach from 1935 to 1939.

The station closed to goods traffic in August 1964, and closed completely on 5 January 1970.

In 1976, the station was given Grade II listed building status.

References

Sources

External links

Disused railway stations in the East Riding of Yorkshire
Railway stations in Great Britain opened in 1847
Railway stations in Great Britain closed in 1970
Grade II listed buildings in the East Riding of Yorkshire
1847 establishments in England
Former York and North Midland Railway stations
George Townsend Andrews railway stations
Grade II listed railway stations